Jens Sparschuh (born 14 May 1955) is a German writer from Chemnitz.

Life 
Sparschuh was born in Chemnitz (then Karl-Marx-Stadt) and grew up in East Berlin. After graduation in Halle (Saale) he studied philosophy and logic in Leningrad from 1973 until 1978.
From 1978, he was assistant-scientist at the Humboldt University of Berlin and in 1983 he got his Ph.D. for the thesis „heuristischen Ausdrucksfähigkeit aussagenlogischer Beweisbegriffe“.

From then on, Sparschuh makes his living as a writer of novels, essays, poetry and audio books.

After the German reunification he briefly was member of the New Forum.

In 2006 and 2019 he gave short courses in Grinnell-College on German literature. He also gave lessons in the Deutsches Literaturinstitut Leipzig.

Awards 
 1988 Anna-Seghers-Preis
 1990 Hörspielpreis der Kriegsblinden
 1996 Förderpreis of the Literaturpreis der Stadt Bremen
 2018 Prix Chronos
 2019 Günter-Grass-Preis

Works

Non fiction 
 Erkenntnistheoretisch-methodologische Untersuchungen zur heuristischen Ausdrucksfähigkeit aussagenlogischer Beweisbegriffe, Berlin 1983

Prose 
 Waldwärts, Berlin 1985
 Der große Coup, Berlin 1987
 Kopfsprung, Berlin 1989
 Indwendig, Winsen/Luhe 1990
 Der Schneemensch, Köln 1993
 Parzival Pechvogel, Zürich (etc.) 1994
 Das Vertreterseminar, Köln 1995
 Der Zimmerspringbrunnen, Köln 1995
French: Fontaine d'appartement, 1999
Italian: Il venditore di fontane, 2000
 Spuren in der Weltwüste, Lichtenfels 1996
 Ich dachte, sie finden uns nicht, Köln 1997
 Die schöne Belinda und ihr Erfinder, Zürich 1997
 Lavaters Maske, Köln 1999
 Die Elbe, Leipzig 2000 (together with Jörn Vanhöfen and Walter Kempowski)
 Stinkstiefel, Zürich 2000
 Eins zu eins, Köln 2003
 Silberblick, Köln 2004
 Vom Tisch, Leipzig 2004

As editor 
 Friedrich von Schiller: Der Geisterseher, Berlin 1984
 Friedrich Hebbel: Läuse der Vernunft, Berlin 1987

Radio play pieces 
 Ein Nebulo bist du together with Manfred Steffen. Director: Norbert Schaeffer. Prod.: SR/SWF/SDR, 1989.  (Hörspielpreis der Kriegsblinden)

References

External links 
 
 ub.fu-berlin.de Link collection of the University Library of the Free University of Berlin 
 Jens Sparschuh in buechernachlese.de Reviews of Ulrich Karger in the Buechernachlese 

1955 births
Living people
People from Chemnitz
Humboldt University of Berlin alumni
German male writers